The Auditor General Act is an Act of Parliament respecting the office of the Auditor General of Canada and sustainable development monitoring and reporting.

References

External links
Auditor General Act
 

Canadian federal legislation
Audit legislation
Legal history of Canada